The New Zealand Legislative Council was the upper house of the General Assembly of New Zealand between 1853 and 1951. An earlier arrangement of legislative councils for the colony and provinces existed from 1841 when New Zealand became a colony; it was reconstituted as the upper house of a bicameral legislature when New Zealand became self-governing in 1852, which came into effect in the following year.

Unlike the elected lower house, the House of Representatives, the Legislative Council was wholly appointed by the governor-general. The New Zealand Constitution Act 1852 had authorised the appointment of a minimum of ten councillors. Beginning in the 1890s, the membership of the upper house became controlled by government of the day. As a result, the Legislative Council possessed little influence. While intended as a revising chamber, in practice, debates and votes typically simply replicated those in the lower house. It was abolished by an Act of Parliament in 1950, with its last sitting in December 1950.

The Council's chamber is no longer utilised as a debating chamber, but it is used for certain ceremonial functions, such as the speech from the throne.

Establishment 

The first Legislative Council was established by the Charter for Erecting the Colony of New Zealand on 16 November 1840, which created New Zealand as a Crown colony separate from New South Wales on 1 July 1841. Originally, the Legislative Council consisted of the governor, colonial secretary, and colonial treasurer, and a number of senior justices of the peace. The Legislative Council had the power to issue ordinances (statutory instruments).

With the passing of the New Zealand Constitution Act 1852, the first Legislative Council was disestablished and a similar appointed body was established, effective from 1853. The new Legislative Council was constituted as the upper house of the General Assembly (or "Parliament"), which did not actually meet until 24 May 1854, 16 months after the Constitution Act had come into force.

Role 
The Legislative Council was intended to act as a revising chamber, scrutinising and amending bills which had been passed by the House of Representatives. It could not initiate bills, and was prohibited from amending money bills (legislation relating to finance and expenditure). The model for the Legislative Council's role was the House of Lords in the United Kingdom.

Membership

Appointment and tenure
The New Zealand Constitution Act 1852 provided for councillors to be appointed for life terms by the governor. As the power of the Governor over New Zealand politics gradually decreased, it became the convention that appointments were made on the recommendation of the premier (later prime minister), essentially meaning that councillors were selected by the government of the day.

However, the life term of councillors meant that the Legislative Council always lagged behind the House of Representatives—premiers were frequently hampered in their activities by a Legislative Council appointed by their predecessors. In 1891, life membership was replaced by a seven-year term by the new Liberal Party government of John Ballance. Part of the Liberal Party's motivation was probably ideological, but part was undoubtedly political, as Ballance's conservative predecessor, Harry Atkinson, had stacked the council with seven conservatives shortly before leaving office. Ballance had considerable difficulty in achieving his reform of the Council, with major clashes occurring between him and the Governor, the Earl of Onslow, who had approved the seven appointments. Ballance's victory is seen as establishing an important precedent in the relationship between governor and prime minister.

The structure of the Legislative Council prior to 1891 was therefore similar to that of the Canadian Senate (which continues as an appointed upper house, although senators are no longer appointed to life terms, and must retire at the age of 75).

The style "The Honourable" could be retained from 1894 by a councillor with not less than ten years service if recommended by the governor. This privilege was extended to one member, William Montgomery, in 1906; and a further eleven members in 1951 after abolition of the Council.

Number of members
It was specified in the Constitution Act 1852 that the Council would consist of at least ten members. Although not actually a part of the Act, instructions were issued that the number of members should not exceed fifteen. One member was to be selected as speaker of the Legislative Council, corresponding roughly to the position of speaker of the House of Representatives. A quorum of five members was established.

The first appointments to the Legislative Council were made in 1853, when twelve members were called to the upper house. They were John Salmon, William Swainson and Frederick Whitaker on 26 May 1853; Mathew Richmond on 23 June 1853; and on 31 December 1853 Edmund Bellairs, George Cutfield, William Kenny, John Yeeden Lloyd, Ralph Richardson, Henry Seymour, Henry St. Hill and John Watts-Russell. Gradually, the maximum number of members was raised, and the limit was eventually abolished. The Council reached a peak of 53 members in 1885 and 1950.

Extent of representation
The Legislative Council was generally less representative of the New Zealand public than was the House of Representatives. Women were not eligible to serve as councillors until 1941, and only five were appointed. Two, Mary Anderson and Mary Dreaver, were appointed in 1946 by the First Labour Government. In 1950, when the First National Government appointed several new members to vote the council out of existence, three women were included; Cora Louisa Burrell, Ethel Gould and Agnes Weston. Māori were slightly better represented. The first two Māori councillors were appointed in 1872, not long after the creation of the Māori electorates in the House; Mōkena Kōhere and Wi Tako Ngātata. A convention was established that there should always be Māori representation on the Council.

1891 appointments
In January 1891 the outgoing Atkinson Ministry appointed six new members to the Legislative Council, with the object of blocking any radical bills that John Ballance (who became Premier on 24 January) and his Liberal Government might introduce. They were the last appointments for life as the new government introduced a seven-year term. The new members were Charles Johnston and John Davies Ormond on 20 January; and Harry Atkinson (elected as speaker), James Fulton, William Downie Stewart, and John Blair Whyte on 22 January. John Hall had written to Ormond: "It will be a serious disaster if the Council is not strengthened before the Reds get into the saddle."

Petitions were tabled against the "stacking of the Council" by MPs and by Aucklanders. But the stacking has been seen as assisting the Liberal Government, which "might not have survived but for this assistance ... [which] provided a useful unifying influence in the critical early years" and "identified with dramatic clarity the reactionary class enemy ... and acted as a convenient brake on the radicals [who] were asked to settle for moderate measures."

Proposals for election
A number of proposals were made that the Legislative Council should be elected, not appointed. When responsible government had been granted at the beginning of the 2nd Parliament, the Governor, Thomas Gore Browne, was given sufficient authority to make the Legislative Council elected, but no action was taken. In 1914, a reform proposal to establish a 42 or 43 member council elected by proportional representation for six years was introduced by the Liberals, but postponed due to World War I. In 1920 it was no longer favoured by the Reform government then in power. But the 1914 Act "remained like a sword of Damocles suspended above the nominated upper house, available at will or whim to any succeeding government".

Abolition 

By the middle of the 20th century, the Legislative Council was increasingly being looked on as ineffectual and making little difference to the legislative process. The Legislative Council rarely criticised bills sent to it by the House, and many believed that it was now obsolete. Some favoured its reform, while others favoured its abolition; among the latter group was the leader of the National Party, Sidney Holland, who introduced a private member's bill to abolish it in August 1947.

However, because the Parliament of New Zealand was unable to amend the New Zealand Constitution Act 1852, it had to first adopt the Statute of Westminster 1931, which it did with the Statute of Westminster Adoption Act 1947. Following the adoption of the Act, the Parliament of New Zealand passed the New Zealand Constitution Amendment (Request and Consent) Act 1947, and the Parliament of the United Kingdom passed the New Zealand Constitution Amendment Act 1947, allowing the New Zealand Parliament to amend the Constitution Act and abolish the Legislative Council. However, the Labour government did not actually enact the abolition itself, and lost office in the 1949 general election.

In 1950, the National Party, now in government, passed the Legislative Council Abolition Act. To assist its passage into law, Holland appointed twenty members (who were dubbed the "suicide squad") to vote for abolition, just as the Australian state of Queensland had done to abolish its upper house in 1922. They included former MPs Harold Dickie and Garnet Mackley.

To encourage co-operation from other members, Holland also promised to use the money saved through abolition to set up a fund for retired members. A Statutes Revision Committee (now defunct) was established to carry out some of the scrutiny that the Legislative Council had been intended for. Although abolition was intended as an interim measure, no serious attempts were made to introduce a new second chamber, and Parliament has been unicameral since.

Proposed reestablishment 
Support for bicameralism is not completely absent, and there have been occasional proposals for a new upper house or Senate. A constitutional reform committee chaired by Ronald Algie proposed an appointed Senate in 1952. The short-lived Liberal Party campaigned on re-establishing an upper house in the 1963 election. In 1990, the National government of Jim Bolger proposed an elected Senate, an idea advanced partly as an alternative to New Zealand's electoral reform process.

Unicameralists in New Zealand, like former Prime Minister Sir Geoffrey Palmer, argued that the country is a small and relatively homogeneous unitary state, and hence does not need the same arrangements as federal states like Australia or Canada. In addition, Peter Dunne, then also a Labour MP, argued that other political reforms in New Zealand such as the strengthening of the select committee system, and the introduction of proportional representation, provided adequate checks and balances, which would simply be duplicated by a second chamber.

Legislative Council Chamber 

The Legislative Council Chamber remains the location of the speech from the throne—as following the British tradition, the sovereign (or a representative) does not enter the elected House. The usher of the Black Rod summons the members of the House of Representatives to attend the Opening of Parliament in the Legislative Council Chamber, where a speech is read usually by the governor-general. It is also used for some select committee meetings, as well as meetings of the Commonwealth Parliamentary Association and other official functions.

See also 
List of members of the New Zealand Legislative Council
Legislative council
Constitution of New Zealand

Notes

References

Bibliography

External links
Sound: the end of the Legislative Council | NZHistory.net.nz, New Zealand history online
 Legislative Council Act, 1891
 Legislative Council Act, 1914
 Legislative Council Abolition Act, 1950

Legislative Council, 1853-1950
Constitution of New Zealand
Parliament of New Zealand
Defunct upper houses
1853 establishments in New Zealand
1950 disestablishments in New Zealand